Mkrtich Arzumanyan (born August 10, 1976), better known as Mko is an Armenian actor, humorist, showman, screenwriter, and producer. He was born in Gyumri (formerly Leninakan). He is known from the comedy duo "Hayko Mko" (with Hayk Marutyan). The duo’s most famous shows were Kargin Haghordum and Kargin Serial. Due to these, he is widely known as Kargin Mko.

Education 

Mkrtich studied at the Russian school N23 after N.K. Krupskaya in Gyumri. After the devastating earthquake of 1988 he moved to school N14. In 1993 he entered the State Engineering University of Armenia (Gyumri branch). In the third year of university studying, he is included in the KVN team of SEUA Gyumri branch, after which the "New Wave" KVN Group has been formed, «Армянский проект» KVN; KVN team of Armenia is formed based on the teams' best players. He worked as an actor, TV host, scriptwriter, producer, and director.

Filmography

Mkrtich starred in more than 10 movies and TV shows. The first movie which he starred in was “Our Yard” in 1996. The first television broadcast which he starred in was a humorous project called "220 Volt" of "Sharm Holding", which has been followed by "Mut Patmutyun" project. In 2002, he started his career in "Kargin Haghordum" comedy program, which has been followed by "Kargin Serial" where he has played the role of Adik (Arkadi Karagyozyan). The famous TV show lasted 6 seasons. In 2013 he began starring in “Tnpesa” sitcom.

Roles

Personal life 
He is married and has two children; boy and girl.

Social media
Facebook
Instagram

References

Mkrtich Arzumanyan IMDb Profile

1976 births
Living people
Armenian male film actors
20th-century Armenian male actors
21st-century Armenian male actors
Armenian male stage actors